Diego Raúl Pozo (born 16 February 1978) is an Argentine former football goalkeeper and football manager, currently in charge of Gimnasia Mendoza.

Playing career

Club
Pozo began his playing career with Godoy Cruz in his hometown of Mendoza in 1995. He also played for Huracán, Talleres and Instituto before joining Colón in 2008.

International
On 20 May 2009 Pozo made his debut with Argentina in a 3–1 friendly match victory against Panama. The Argentine team was made up of players based in the Argentine Primera División. He also played the friendlies against Ghana and Haiti, as well as the unofficial friendly against Catalonia. Pozo had a poor performance at the aforementioned unofficial friendly. Subsequently, he was called up for Argentina's 2010 FIFA World Cup squad as the third goalkeeper.

Coaching career
Ahead of the 2019–20 season, Pozo was appointed manager of Gimnasia Mendoza.

References

External links
  Argentine Primera statistics at Fútbol XXI
  Colón profile 
 

1978 births
Living people
People from Mendoza Province
Sportspeople from Mendoza, Argentina
Argentine footballers
Argentina international footballers
Association football goalkeepers
Godoy Cruz Antonio Tomba footballers
Club Atlético Huracán footballers
Talleres de Córdoba footballers
Instituto footballers
Club Atlético Colón footballers
Rangers de Talca footballers
Chilean Primera División players
Argentine Primera División players
Expatriate footballers in Chile
2010 FIFA World Cup players